Krągi  (formerly German Krangen) is a village in the administrative district of Gmina Borne Sulinowo, within Szczecinek County, West Pomeranian Voivodeship, in north-western Poland.

Before 1648 the area was part of Duchy of Pomerania and in 1648–1945 part of Prussia and Germany. For the history of the region, see History of Pomerania.

The village has an approximate population of 400.

References

Villages in Szczecinek County